March 2 - Eastern Orthodox liturgical calendar - March 4

All fixed commemorations below are observed on March 16 by Orthodox Churches on the Old Calendar.

For March 3rd, Orthodox Churches on the Old Calendar commemorate the Saints listed on February 17 (February 18 on leap years).

Saints

 Martyrs Eutropius and Cleonicus of Amasea, and Basiliscus of Comana (308)
 Venerable Piama, virgin (337)
 Hieromartyr Theodoretus, Bishop, of Antioch, by beheading (361-363)
 Venerable Alexandra of Alexandria (4th century)
 Venerable Saints Zenon and Zoilus.
 Venerable Shio Mgvime, monk, of Georgia (6th century)
 Saint John IV (Chrysostom), Catholicos of Georgia (1001)
 Saint John V (Chrysostom), Catholicos of Georgia (1048)

Pre-Schism Western saints

 Martyrs Marinus and Asterius
 Martyrs Hemeterius and Cheledonius, believed to have been soldiers, suffered in Calahorra in Old Castile (ca. 298)
 Saint Camilla, born in Civitavecchia, she became a disciple of St Germanus of Auxerre in France, where she lived as an anchoress (ca. 437)
 Martyrs Felix, Luciolus, Fortunatus, Marcia and Companions, a group of forty martyrs in North Africa.
 Saint Winwaloe, Abbot of Landévennec Abbey, Brittany (ca. 530)
 Saint Titian of Brescia, Germanic by birth, became Bishop of Brescia in Italy (ca. 536)
 Saint Caluppan of Auvergne in Gaul (576)
 Saint Non (Nonnita, Nonna), mother of St. David of Wales (6th century)
 Saint Foila (Faile), sister of St Colgan (6th century)
 Saint Arthelais, one of the patron-saints of Benevento in Italy, where she fled from Constantinople (6th century)
 Saint Lamalisse (Molaise of Leighlin), a hermit in Scotland, he left his name to the islet of Lamlash off the coast of the Isle of Arran in Scotland (7th century)
 Saint Sacer (Mo-Sacra, Mosacra), founder of the monastery of Saggart near Dublin in Ireland (7th century)
 Saint Cele-Christ, otherwise "Worshipper of Christ", a hermit for many years, eventually forced to become a Bishop in Leinster (ca. 728)
 Saint Anselm, Abbott, founder of a monastery at Fanano, and the Nonantola Abbey (803)
 Saint Cunigunde of Luxembourg, wife of Henry II, founder of Kaufungen Abbey (1039)

Post-Schism Orthodox saints

 Holy 9 Martyrs of Georgia (Nine Brothers Kherkheulidze), at Marabda (1625)  (see also: August 3)

New martyrs and confessors

 Virgin-martyr Martha Kovrova and martyr Michael Stroeva (1938)

Other commemorations

 Our Lady of Gidle (1082)
 Synaxis of the Volokolamsk Icon of the Most Holy Theotokos (1572)
 Icon of the Mother of God "Zlatoustovskaya" (1848)  (see also: November 27)
 Repose of Metropolitan Laurus (Shkurla) of the Russian Orthodox Church Outside of Russia (2008)

Icon gallery

Notes

References

Sources
 March 3/March 16. Orthodox Calendar (PRAVOSLAVIE.RU).
 March 16 / March 3. HOLY TRINITY RUSSIAN ORTHODOX CHURCH (A parish of the Patriarchate of Moscow).
 March 3. OCA - The Lives of the Saints.
 The Autonomous Orthodox Metropolia of Western Europe and the Americas (ROCOR). St. Hilarion Calendar of Saints for the year of our Lord 2004. St. Hilarion Press (Austin, TX). p. 19.
 March 3. Latin Saints of the Orthodox Patriarchate of Rome.
 The Roman Martyrology. Transl. by the Archbishop of Baltimore. Last Edition, According to the Copy Printed at Rome in 1914. Revised Edition, with the Imprimatur of His Eminence Cardinal Gibbons. Baltimore: John Murphy Company, 1916. pp. 64–65.
 Rev. Richard Stanton. A Menology of England and Wales, or, Brief Memorials of the Ancient British and English Saints Arranged According to the Calendar, Together with the Martyrs of the 16th and 17th Centuries. London: Burns & Oates, 1892. pp. 98–100.
Greek Sources
 Great Synaxaristes:  3 ΜΑΡΤΙΟΥ. ΜΕΓΑΣ ΣΥΝΑΞΑΡΙΣΤΗΣ.
  Συναξαριστής. 3 Μαρτίου. ECCLESIA.GR. (H ΕΚΚΛΗΣΙΑ ΤΗΣ ΕΛΛΑΔΟΣ). 
Russian Sources
  16 марта (3 марта). Православная Энциклопедия под редакцией Патриарха Московского и всея Руси Кирилла (электронная версия). (Orthodox Encyclopedia - Pravenc.ru).
  3 марта (ст.ст.) 16 марта 2013 (нов. ст.). Русская Православная Церковь Отдел внешних церковных связей. (DECR).

March in the Eastern Orthodox calendar